Abscisate beta-glucosyltransferase (ABA-glucosyltransferase, ABA-GTase, AOG) is an enzyme with systematic name UDP-D-glucose:abscisate beta-D-glucosyltransferase. This enzyme catalyses the following chemical reaction

 UDP-D-glucose + abscisate  UDP + beta-D-glucopyranosyl abscisate

The enzyme acts better on (S)-2-trans-abscisate than the natural (S)-2-cis isomer, abscisate, or its enantiomer, the (R)-2-cis isomer.

References

External links 
 

EC 2.4.1